The Central District of Bandar Lengeh County is a district (bakhsh) in Bandar Lengeh County, Hormozgan Province, Iran. At the 2006 census, its population was 78,368, in 15,848 families.  The District has three cities: Bandar Lengeh , Lamazan and Kong. The District has four rural districts (dehestan): Dezhgan Rural District, Howmeh Rural District, Mehran Rural District, and Moghuyeh Rural District.

References 

Districts of Hormozgan Province
Bandar Lengeh County